Zartoshtabad (also Romanized as Zartoshtābād; also known as Āb-e Zarī, Fajrābād, Zardoshtābād, and Zardushabad) is a village in Khanandabil-e Sharqi Rural District, in the Central District of Khalkhal County, Ardabil Province, Iran. At the 2006 census, its population was 63, in 13 families.

References 

Towns and villages in Khalkhal County